The fifth annual Altazor Awards took place on April 5, 2004, at the Centro Cultural Matucana 100. The nominees were announced on January 22.

Nominations
Winners are in bold text.

Literary Arts

Narrative 
 Roberto Bolaño  – El gaucho Insufrible
 Ramón Díaz Eterovic  – El color de la piel
 Pedro Lemebel  – Zanjón de la aguada
 Germán Marín  – Un animal mudo levanta la vista

Poetry 
 Óscar Hahn  – Obras selectas de Oscar Hahn
 Eduardo Llanos  – Antología Presunta
 Armando Roa  – Fundación Mítica del Reino de Chile
 Raúl Zurita  – INRI

Essay 
 José Bengoa  – Los antiguos mapuches del sur
 Miguel Castillo Didier  – Kavafis íntegro
 Carla Cordua  – Cabos sueltos
 Jorge Montealegre  – Frazadas del Estadio Nacional

Visual Arts

Painting 
 Carlos Altamirano  – Un cuadro en que falta pintar algunas cosas
 Bororo  – Ciudadanía sobre tela
 Ximena Cristi  – A la hora de tomar chocolate
 Ismael Frigerio  – Zona de construcción

Sculpture 
 Federico Assler  – Roca Negra
 José Vicente Gajardo  – Sculptures of José Vicente Gajardo
 Francisco Gazitúa  – Caballos de Acero
 Pilar Ovalle  – El Impacto Interior

Engraving and Drawing 
 Roser Bru  – Roser Bru. A set of 34 of his engraving in his eightieth birthday
 Jaime Cruz  – Desde las Raíces
 Matilde Pérez  – Serigrafías
 Patricia Vargas  – Cielo Raso

Installation art and Video art 
 Claudio Correa  – No se gana como robando
 Claudia Missana  – No Palabra
 Mario Navarro  – Radio Ideal
 Ximena Zomosa  – Colección de la artista

Photography 
 Roberto Edwards  – La Fiesta del Cuerpo
 Alvaro Hoppe  – No a la violencia, Sí al amor
 Marcelo Montecinos  – Santiago j.p.g.
 Leonora Vicuña  – Relatos Breves

Performing Arts Theatre

Dramaturgy 
 Ramón Griffero  – Tus deseos en Fragmentos
 Mateo Iribarren  – La Condición Humana
 Alejandro Moreno  – Mujer Gallina
 Egon Wolff  – La Recomendación

Director 
 Alfredo Castro  – Mano de Obra
 Ramón Griffero  – Tus Deseos en Fragmentos
 Compañía La Tropa: Laura Pizarro, Jaime Lorca and Juan Carlos Zagal  – Jesús Betz
 Rodrigo Pérez  – Provincia Señalada (una velada patriótica)

Actor 
 Tito Bustamante  – Jesús se subió al Metro
 Jaime Lorca  – Jesús Betz
 Daniel Muñoz  – Jesús se subió al Metro
 Rodolfo Pulgar  – Jesús se subió al Metro

Actress 
 Claudia Celedón  – Mujer Gallina
 Paola Giannini  – Mano de Obra
 Coca Guazzini  – Querida Elena
 Amparo Noguera  – Provincia Señalada (una velada patriótica)

Performing Arts Dance

Choreography 
 Sonia Araus  – Miradas Cruzadas. Homenaje a Sara Vial
 Nelson Avilés  – Carne de Cañón
 Verónica Varas  – Sobre la Piel. Ttilogía + 1
 Claudia Vicuña and Alejandro Cáceres  – Proyecto Contenedor

Male Dancer 
 Jorge Carreño  – Latente
 Cesar Morales  – Giselle
 Luis Ortigoza  – Tanguero
 Miguel Ángel Serrano  – Madama Butterfly

Female Dancer 
 Carola Alvear  – París-Santiago
 Carolina Bravo  – Carne de Cañón
 Paola Moret  – Emergencias
 Vivian Romo  – Quisiera ser tu sombra

Musical Arts

Classical music 
 Pablo Aranda  – Nueve Composiciones de Cámara
 Pablo Délano  – Ave María I Para Voces Femeninas
 Luis Orlandini  – Simpay. Música de Cámara para Guitarra
 Cirilo Vila  – De Sueños y…

Traditional music 
 Héctor Pavez  – Chiloé del 58
 Horacio Salinas  – Remos en el agua 
 Juan Antonio Sánchez  – Soyobré
 Freddy Torrealba  – Charango al Sur del Charango

Ballad 
 Cecilia Echenique  – Brasil Amado
 Luis Jara  – Mi Destino
 Alberto Plaza  – Febrero 14
 Alvaro Véliz  – Mía

Pop/Rock 
 Pablo Ilabaca  – 31 Minutos
 Quique Neira  – Eleven
 Papanegro  – Superactivo
 Weichafe  – Weichafe

Alternative/Jazz 
 Claudio Araya  – El fulgor (los círculos del planeta)
 Congreso  – Congreso de Exportación
 Ernesto Holman  – Ñamco
 Pablo Lecaros  – Quinto Primero

Playing 
 Héctor Briceño (Trombone)
 Carlos Corales (Acoustic guitar and Electric guitar)
 David del Pino (Direction of La Pasión según San Mateo by Johann Sebastián)
 Alberto Dourthé (Concertmaster)

Media Arts Film

Director Fiction 
 Matías Bize  – Sábado
 Marcelo Ferrari  – Subterra
 Boris Quercia  – Sexo con Amor 
 Andrés Waissbluth  – Los Debutantes

Director Documentary 
 Carlos Klein  – Tierra de Agua
 Pablo Perelman  – Bitácora de un actor
 Verónica Quense  – Triste
 Raúl Ruiz  – Cofralandes

Actor 
 Patricio Bunster  – Subterra
 Boris Quercia  – Sexo con Amor
 Álvaro Rudolphy  – Sexo con Amor
 Alejandro Trejo  – Los Debutantes

Actress 
 Consuelo Holzapfel  – Subterra
 María Izquierdo  – Sexo con Amor
 Mariana Loyola  – Subterra
 Gabriela Medina  – Subterra

Media Arts TV

Director Drama 
 Herval Abreu  – Machos
 Beltrán "Toti" García  – Francisca (Cuentos de Mujeres)
 Tatiana Gaviola  – La Baby "se lee como se escribe" (Cuentos de Mujeres)
 María Eugenia Rencoret  – Pecadores

Director TV Show 
 Alvaro Díaz and Pedro Peirano  – 31 Minutos
 Patricio Hernández  – Testigo
 Jaime Sepúlveda  – Biografías
 Rodrigo Sepúlveda  – Tronia

Screenplay 
 Felipe Blanco  – Septiembre
 Alvaro Díaz, Pedro Peirano, Daniel Castro and Rodrigo Salinas  – 31 Minutos
 Sebastián Arrau, Coca Gómez and Pablo Illanes  – Machos
 Marcelo Leonart, Hugo Morales, Nona Fernández and Ximena Carrera  – 16

Actor 
 Héctor Noguera  – Machos
 José Soza  – Puertas Adentro
 Benjamín Vicuña  – Pecadores
 Jorge Zabaleta  – Machos

Actress 
 Carolina Arregui  – Machos
 Solange Lackington  – Machos
 Mariana Loyola  – Machos
 Teresita Reyes  – Machos

References

garotas

Chilean awards